The 2016–17 Czech Extraliga season was the 24th season of the Czech Extraliga since its creation after the breakup of Czechoslovakia and the Czechoslovak First Ice Hockey League in 1993.

Regular season
As of March 3, 2017

CHL Qualification to Champions Hockey League

Playoffs

Play-in Round
 HC Vítkovice Steel - HC Škoda Plzeň 2:3 (3:1, 3:2 OT, 3:5, 2:5, 1:2 OT)
 Piráti Chomutov - BK Mladá Boleslav 3:2 (1:7, 1:6, 5:1, 2:1, 6:1)

Play-off final: HC Bílí Tygři Liberec - HC Kometa Brno 0:4 (3:4, 3:4 OT, 0:3, 2:5). HC Kometa Brno has won its first Czech league title (and 12th overall title; first since 1966).

Relegation

References

External links 
 

Czech
2016–17 in Czech ice hockey leagues
Czech Extraliga seasons